Sidironero (before 1927: Οσενίτσα - Osenitsa) is a village and a former community in the Drama regional unit, East Macedonia and Thrace, Greece. Since the 2011 local government reform it is part of the municipality Drama, of which it is a municipal unit. It lies in the Rhodope Mountains region along the Bulgarian border in the northern part of the Drama regional unit between Kato Nevrokopi and Paranesti.

The municipal unit is subdivided into two local communities (constituent villages listed in brackets):
Sidironero (Kallikarpo, Oropedio, Pappades, Sidironero)
Skaloti 
The population of the municipal unit was 412 inhabitants, of which 228 in Sidironero village, at the 2011 census.

References

Populated places in Drama (regional unit)
Chech
Drama, Greece